Yadin is a Hebrew name, used as both a first and last name, which comes from the root word "din" (law or judgment). Yadin is the future tense of the verb conjugated in the third person, meaning “(he) will enact justice,” “(he) will make law” or “(he) will judge.”

Antiquity

The word Yadin appears in the Hebrew Bible (and elsewhere) usually referring to the Almighty who will judge nations "Yadin Amim Bemeisharim" and similarly in other contexts.

Other Biblical References

People
Yadin, as a surname, may refer to:
Avihai Yadin, an Israeli football (soccer) player
Azzan Yadin, an Associate Professor of Jewish Studies at Rutgers University
Yigael Yadin, an Israeli archeologist, politician, and soldier

Yadin, as a forename, may refer to:
Yadin Dudai, an Israeli neuroscientist

See also
Beth Din
Yadin Yadin

External links
 The Hebrew University of Jerusalem
  The Israel Koschitzky Virtual Beit Midrash
  SEPHARDIM.COM
  Soc.Culture.Jewish Newsgroups
  Baby Chatter – Bay Boy Names and Meanings

Hebrew words and phrases
Hebrew-language surnames
Jewish surnames